Donacia fennica is a species of leaf beetles of the subfamily Donaciinae. It can be found in Iberian Peninsula and Western Siberia.

References

Beetles described in 1800
Donaciinae
Beetles of Europe